John McAuley Palmer may refer to:

John M. Palmer (politician) (1817–1900), governor of Illinois
John McAuley Palmer (general) (1870–1955), his grandson